William Hehir (18 January 1887 – 15 October 1972) was a British track and field athlete who competed in the 1920 Summer Olympics in racewalking events. He was born in Lisdoonvarna in County Clare, Ireland, but was associated with the Surrey Walking Club. He died in London

In 1920 he finished fifth in the 10 kilometre walk competition and seventh in the 3 kilometre walk competition.

References

External links
William Hehir's profile at the British Olympic Committee

1887 births
1972 deaths
British male racewalkers
Olympic athletes of Great Britain
Athletes (track and field) at the 1920 Summer Olympics
Irish male racewalkers
Sportspeople from County Clare